Sasirekha Parinayam  is an Indian folktale based on oral traditions popular in Telugu States. While it uses characters who appear in the Mahabharata, the story is not present in the epic. The plot concerns the marriage of Sasirekha, called Vatsala in some versions, the daughter of Balarama, to Abhimanyu, the son of Arjuna. It echoes the marriage of Arjuna to Subhadra in the Mahabharata.

The story is popular in performances, including Tholu bommalata (shadow puppets), Yakshagana, and Kuchipudi. By early 1950s, Surabhi theatre troupes made the folktale popular across Telugu-speaking regions.

The story was adapted to cinema multiple times. According M. L. Narasimham of The Hindu, Baburao Painter adapted the folktale thrice as a silent film in 1919, 1921 and 1923 with V. Shantaram as Lord Krishna. Nanubhai Vakil directed the first talkie version of the tale in 1932 in Hindi. R. Padmanaban made a Tamil film based on the story in 1935. P. V. Das adapted it into his 1936 Telugu film Mayabazar (also known as Sasirekha Parinayam).

The most popular film made on the folktale is the 1957 Telugu film Mayabazar. On the centenary of Indian cinema in 2013, CNN-IBN included the 1957 Mayabazar in its list of "100 greatest Indian films of all time". In an online poll conducted by CNN-IBN among those 100 films, it was voted by the public as the "greatest Indian film of all time."

The 2008 Telugu film Sasirekha Parinayam was also named after it. The story was adapted into a Hindi film titled Veer Ghatotkach in 1948 and was remade in 1970, from Ghatotkacha's perspective. It was also made into the animated film Ghatotkach in 2008.

References

Kuchipudi